The Wilbur Cahoon House is one of the oldest homes in Lorain County, Ohio, United States. Wilbur Cahoon arrived in Avon in 1814 from Herkimer County, New York with his wife, Priscilla and family; he was Avon's first settler and an early industrialist. His new land was covered by a forest, and he and his family constructed a log cabin as a temporary shelter. In the following year, he began to build a sawmill nearby along French Creek, and in 1818 established a gristmill. The log cabin was no longer the Cahoon family home after 1826, when the present house was erected. Later in life, Cahoon entered into local public service: he served as Justice of the Peace for Avon, Sheffield and Dover Townships, as well as holding offices such as overseer of the poor, elections judge, and constable.

Cahoon's house is a Greek Revival building with prominent local vernacular influences.  Although the style is typical of period houses in the region, its floor plan is unusually disorderly, in contrast to the symmetry of typical Greek Revival structures, and the house is unusually short for its footprint.  Set on a stone foundation, the house is a two-story wooden structure with a protruding gabled section on the left, as seen from the road.  Shuttered windows fill much of the wall space on the facade.

In 1978, the Cahoon House was listed on the National Register of Historic Places, qualifying because of its connection to Cahoon.  As the home of the first pioneer in the area and as one of the area's earliest buildings in any architectural style, it occupies a significant place in local history.

References

External links

Greek Revival houses in Ohio
Houses on the National Register of Historic Places in Ohio
Houses in Lorain County, Ohio
National Register of Historic Places in Lorain County, Ohio
Wooden houses in the United States
Houses completed in 1826